Carpacin is a naturally occurring organic compound first isolated from the Carpano tree (an unidentified Cinnamomum species of the family Lauraceae which is native to Bougainville Island), from which it derives its name. It is also found in essential oils of the genus Crowea.

Carpacin is a biosynthetic precursor of the more complex lignan-dimer, carpanone.  It is classified as a phenylpropanoid.

Carpacin has been prepared synthetically from sesamol and has been studied for potential use as an insecticide and inhibitor of carcinogenesis.

References 

Phenylpropenes
O-methylated phenylpropanoids
Benzodioxoles